Arlesey Athletic F.C. was a football club based in Arlesey, Bedfordshire, England. In their last season they played in the Spartan South Midlands Football League Division One.

History
The club was formed in 2003 joining the Spartan South Midlands League Division Two, and groundsharing the Hitchin Road ground of Isthmian League club Arlesey Town. In their first season, 2003–04 they finished third and were promoted to Division One, where they played for the remainder of their existence, their highest league position coming in the 2005–06 season, when they finished in sixth place. In four FA Vase matches they failed to win a game.

Players Mark Phillips and Daniel Lane were appointed joint managers on 11 November 2007. They did not appear to be affiliated to a league for the 2009–10 season, after resigning from the Spartan South Midlands League.

Honours
Cups
North Beds Charity Cup runners-up (1): 2004–05

Player awards
As of July 2008
2006–07 season
Managers Player – Chris Reeves
Players Player – Scotty Waters
2007–08 season
Managers Player – Steve Bannister
Players Player – Terry Lock

References

External links

Arlesey Athletic FC website

Defunct football clubs in England
Spartan South Midlands Football League
Association football clubs established in 2003
Association football clubs disestablished in 2009
Defunct football clubs in Bedfordshire
2003 establishments in England
2009 disestablishments in England